Zaiyuan (1816–1861), formally known as Prince Yi, was a Manchu prince of the Qing dynasty. He was one of the eight regents appointed by the Xianfeng Emperor to assist his successor, the Tongzhi Emperor.

Life
Zaiyuan was born in the Aisin Gioro clan as a descendant of Yinxiang (1686–1730), the 13th son of the Kangxi Emperor. He inherited his ancestors' peerage, "Prince Yi of the First Rank", in 1852 during the reign of the Daoguang Emperor (r. 1820–50).

Zaiyuan took up important positions during the reign of the Xianfeng Emperor (r. 1850–61), including a minister in the Imperial Clan Court and an imperial guard commander. In 1860, during the Second Opium War, Zaiyuan and Muyin (穆蔭) travelled to Tongzhou to replace Guiliang (桂良) in the peace negotiations with the British and French. When the negotiations failed, the Mongol general Sengge Rinchen captured the British diplomats Harry Smith Parkes and Henry Loch, Thomas William Bowlby (a journalist for The Times), and their escorts. The majority of the group – except the two diplomats – died from torture or disease; the survivors were released later. The Anglo-French expeditionary force closed in on Beijing. On 18 October, in retaliation for the capture and deaths of the peace delegation, the British and French destroyed the Old Summer Palace (Yuanmingyuan). Zaiyuan had already fled with the Xianfeng Emperor to the Chengde Mountain Resort in Hebei. Prince Gong, who was ordered to remain behind to make peace with the invaders, successfully concluded the Convention of Beijing with the British, French and Russians.

Before the Xianfeng Emperor died in 1861, he appointed Zaiyuan, Sushun, Duanhua and five others as regents to assist his son, who succeeded him as the Tongzhi Emperor (r. 1861–75). Later that year, Prince Gong, with support from the Empress Dowagers Ci'an and Cixi, launched the Xinyou Coup and seized power from the eight regents. Zaiyuan was arrested, imprisoned, and given a piece of white silk cloth to commit suicide by hanging himself with the cloth. After Zaiyuan's death, the Prince Yi peerage was inherited by Zaidun (載敦), one of his distant relatives.

See also
 Prince Yi (怡)
 Royal and noble ranks of the Qing dynasty
 Ranks of imperial consorts in China#Qing

References

 

1861 deaths
1816 births
19th-century Chinese people
19th-century viceregal rulers
Qing dynasty imperial princes
Prince Yi(怡)
Manchu politicians
Qing dynasty regents
Forced suicides of Chinese people
Suicides by hanging in China
Executed Qing dynasty people
People executed by the Qing dynasty
Suicides in the Qing dynasty
1860s suicides